Lake Gilead is a  controlled lake located in Carmel Hamlet in Putnam County, New York. The lake is located within the lower Hudson River basin in the Croton River watershed.

Lake Gilead is part of the Croton Watershed of the New York City water supply system.  A dam and spillway are located on its southern end, with a 500' shore-to-shore set-back restricting boaters from the area.

Recreational use of the controlled lakes falls under DEP regulations. Fishing and self-powered boating are allowed with a valid DEP permit and New York State Department of Environmental Conservation-issued fishing license. Swimming is prohibited.

Ice fishing is allowed on Lake Gilead during the winter. Fish species present include (but are not limited to) largemouth bass, rainbow, lake and brown trout, chain pickerel, yellow perch, and panfish. In the 1990s a local fisherman illegally introduced northern pike, though they are rarely caught.

References

Gilead
Gilead
Gilead
Croton Watershed
Water infrastructure of New York City
Protected areas of Putnam County, New York
Gilead